Little Brechin is a village in Angus, Scotland. It lies approximately two miles north of Brechin on the north side of the A90 road.

References

See also
Brechin

Villages in Angus, Scotland